Puroik may refer to:

Puroik language
Puroik people

Language and nationality disambiguation pages